"Beweg dein Arsch" ("Move your ass") is a rock song written by Bob Arnz and Gerd Zimmermann for LaFee's 2007 second album Jetzt erst recht. The song is the album's fifth track, and was released as its second single. The single reached twenty two in the German Singles Charts when released in August 2007.

An English version of the song, entitled "Come On", later appeared on LaFee's third studio album Shut Up.

Track listing
CD Single
 "Beweg dein Arsch" (Radio Edit) - 2:40
 "Beweg dein Arsch" (Instrumental) - 2:40

CD Maxi Single
"Beweg dein Arsch" (Single version) - 2:41
"Es tut weh" - 4:02
"Beweg dein Arsch" (Club mix) - 2:49
"Beweg dein Arsch: Directors Cut" (Enhanced part) 
"Der Tanz zu "Beweg dein Arsch"" (Enhanced part)
"Documentary Snippet: Part 2" (Enhanced part)

Charts

References

External links
LaFee's official website

2007 singles
German songs
LaFee songs
2007 songs
Songs about dancing
Songs written by Bob Arnz
EMI Records singles
Songs written by Gerd Zimmermann (songwriter)